A list of notable politicians of the Communist Refoundation Party (Italy):

A
 Maurizio Acerbo
 Vittorio Agnoletto
 Vincenzo Aita

B
 Fausto Bertinotti

C
 Giusto Catania
 Ludovico Corrao
 Armando Cossutta
 Rosario Crocetta

D
 Pancrazio De Pasquale

F
 Francesco Ferrara
 Paolo Ferrero
 Francesco Forgione

G
 Corrado Gabriele
 Sergio Garavini
 Franco Giordano
 Claudio Grassi
 Vladimir Luxuria

I
 Pietro Ingrao

M
 Lucio Magri
 Graziella Mascia
 Luisa Morgantini
 Roberto Musacchio

N
 Nerio Nesi

P
 Giovanni Pesce
 Giuliano Pisapia

R
 Mario Ricci
 Marco Rizzo

V
 Dacia Valent
 Nichi Vendola

 
Communist Refoundation Party politicians